The 2017–18 Utah Utes women's basketball team represents the University of Utah during the 2017–18 NCAA Division I women's basketball season. The Utes, led by third year head coach Lynne Roberts, play their home games at the Jon M. Huntsman Center and are members of the Pac-12 Conference. They finished the season 18–14, 8–10 in Pac-12 play to finish in eighth place. They lost in the first round of the Pac-12 women's tournament to Colorado. They received an automatic to the Women's National Invitation Tournament where they defeated UNLV in the first round before losing to Kansas State in the second round.

Previous season
They finished the season 16–15, 5–13 in Pac-12 play to finish in a 4 way tie for ninth place. They lost in the first round of the Pac-12 women's tournament to Arizona State. They were invited to the Women's National Invitation Tournament where they lost to UC Davis in the first round.

Roster

Schedule and results 

|-
!colspan=9 style=| Exhibition

|-
!colspan=9 style=| Non-conference regular season

|-
!colspan=9 style=| Pac-12 regular season

|-
!colspan=9 style=| Pac-12 Women's Tournament

|-
!colspan=9 style=| WNIT

Rankings
2017–18 NCAA Division I women's basketball rankings

See also
2017–18 Utah Utes men's basketball team

References 

Utah Utes women's basketball seasons
Utah
Utah Utes
Utah Utes
Utah